The Journal for the Study of Religion, Nature and Culture (JSRNC) is a peer-reviewed academic journal on religious studies. The journal is the official journal of the International Society for the Study of Religion, Nature and Culture. The idea for the journal emerged during the preparation of the interdisciplinary Encyclopedia of Religion and Nature. 

JSRNC was described in its founding editor's inaugural editorial as a "reframed" version of a predecessor journal named Ecotheology (ISSN 1363-7320). From 1996 to 2006, Ecotheology had published eleven volumes that are now archived and available at the website of JSRNC.

The journal JSRNC is indexed or abstracted by the following services:

Scopus Abstract and Citation Database
ATLA Religion Database
Religious and Theological Abstracts
European Reference Index for the Humanities (ERIH Plus)
EBSCO's Academic Search Premier & Religion and Philosophy Collection
Bibliography of Humanities and Social Sciences Literature, K.G. Saur Verlag
Emerging Sources Citation Index (ESCI)
Index to the Study of Religions Online

References

External links
 

Religious studies journals
Quarterly journals
Publications established in 2007
English-language journals
Equinox Publishing (Sheffield) academic journals